Sabrina Giusto (born 31 August 1971) is a Brazilian former professional tennis player.

Giusto reached a best ranking of 171 in the world and twice featured in the qualifying draw for the French Open. She played Federation Cup tennis for Brazil in 1991, featuring in three ties, with her only win coming against Paraguay's Larissa Schaerer.

ITF finals

Singles: 3 (2–1)

Doubles: 3 (1–2)

References

External links
 
 
 

1971 births
Living people
Brazilian female tennis players
20th-century Brazilian women
21st-century Brazilian women